The Greenville Braves were an American minor league baseball franchise, based in Greenville, South Carolina, that served as the Class AA farm team of the Atlanta Braves between 1984 and 2004. The Braves played in Greenville Municipal Stadium for all 21 years of their existence. 

The team had much success and many famous future Atlanta players such as Tom Glavine, Chipper Jones, Javy López, Jason Marquis, Eddie Pérez, Andruw Jones, and John Rocker played there. They won multiple Southern League championships, and the 1992 edition, managed by Grady Little and featuring Chipper Jones and López, won 100 out of 143 games (.699) during the regular season to take the pennant, then captured the SL playoff title. The 1992 Braves were recognized as one of the 100 greatest minor league teams of all time. After the 2004 season, the parent club in Atlanta transferred the G-Braves to Pearl, Mississippi, where the team is now known as the Mississippi Braves.

The Braves cited an outdated stadium that did not meet current standards and the City of Greenville's unwillingness to create a sufficient financial package to build a new stadium as the cause of the move.  With the Greenville Braves out, the Greenville Bombers (formerly the Capital City Bombers), Class A South Atlantic League affiliate of the Boston Red Sox, moved into the old Braves stadium in 2005.  In 2006, a brand new stadium located in Downtown Greenville, Fluor Field at the West End, opened and the Bombers changed their name to the Greenville Drive.

Greenville Braves (WCL, 1963–64)
Greenville also hosted a team in the low Class A Western Carolinas League—the former identity (1960–79) of the South Atlantic League—called the Braves as an affiliate of the Milwaukee Braves in 1963 and 1964. This two-year affiliation was brief, but produced the 1963 playoff champions of the WCL. When the New York Mets replaced the Braves as the team's parent in 1965, the nickname was changed.

Hall of Fame Alumni
Tom Glavine, All Star starting pitcher and Baseball Hall of Fame inductee in 2014
Chipper Jones, All Star third baseman and Baseball Hall of Fame inductee in 2018

Notable former players
Jim Acker, pitcher with the Toronto Blue Jays and Atlanta Braves
Tommy Greene, All Star pitcher, threw a no hitter for the Philadelphia Phillies.
Andruw Jones, All Star outfielder, won 10 consecutive Rawlings Gold Glove Awards 1998-2007
David Justice, All Star outfielder. 1990 National League Rookie of the Year.
Jason Marquis, All Star starting pitcher, Silver Slugger Award
Kent Mercker, starting pitcher
Adam Wainwright, All Star starting pitcher
Chipper Jones, Hall of Fame Third Baseman. 1999 MVP. 2008 batting champion.
Mark Wohlers, All Star reliever, threw a combined no-hitter in 1991
Javy Lopez, All Star catcher, NLCS MVP

Season-by-season records
The following is a list of the Greenville Braves season-by-season record.

References

Defunct Southern League (1964–present) teams
Baseball in Greenville, South Carolina
Baseball teams established in 1984
Sports clubs disestablished in 2004
1984 establishments in South Carolina
2004 disestablishments in South Carolina
Professional baseball teams in South Carolina
Defunct Western Carolinas League teams